The 1897 Alabama Crimson White football team (variously "Alabama", "UA" or "Bama") represented the University of Alabama in the 1897 Southern Intercollegiate Athletic Association football season. The team was led by head coach Allen McCants, in his first season, and played their home games at The Quad in Tuscaloosa, Alabama. In what was the sixth season of Alabama football, the team finished with a record of one win and zero losses (1–0, 0–0 SIAA).

In the spring of 1895, the University Board of Trustees passed a rule that prohibited athletic teams from competing off-campus for athletic events, and as such only one game was scheduled for the season. In their only game, the Crimson White shutout the Tuscaloosa Athletic Club on The Quad.

Schedule

Game summaries

Tuscaloosa Athletic Club
In what was the only game played as part of the 1897 season due to prohibition against playing away games, Alabama defeated the Tuscaloosa Athletic Club 6–0 at The Quad in Tuscaloosa. Immediately after their victory, Alabama disbanded their team for the remainder of the season due to an inability to secure any additional home games.

Players

Notes

References

Alabama
Alabama Crimson Tide football seasons
College football undefeated seasons
Alabama Crimson White football